The Quebec Act 1774, or British North America (Quebec) Act 1774, was an Act of the Parliament of Great Britain which set procedures of governance in the Province of Quebec. One of the principal components of the Act was the expansion of the province's territory to take over part of the Indian Reserve, including much of what is now southern Ontario, Illinois, Indiana, Michigan, Ohio, Wisconsin, and parts of Minnesota.

The Act removed the reference to the Protestant faith from the oath of allegiance, and guaranteed free practice of Catholicism and restored the Church's power to impose tithes. Additionally, it restored the use of the French civil law for matters of private law, except for the granting of unlimited freedom of testation in accordance with English common law; which was maintained for matters of public law, including administrative appeals, court procedure, and criminal prosecution.

In Quebec, English-speaking immigrants from the Thirteen Colonies objected to a variety of its provisions, which they saw as a removal of certain political freedoms. Meanwhile, Canadiens varied in their reaction; the land-owning seigneurs and ecclesiastics for example were generally happy with its provisions.

In the Thirteen Colonies, the Act had been passed in the same session of Parliament as a number of other Acts designed as punishment for the Boston Tea Party and other protests, which the American Patriots collectively termed the Intolerable Acts or, in England, the Coercive Acts. Moreover, the Act were seen by the colonists as a new model for administration, which would strip them of their self-elected assemblies, and appeared to void some of the colonies' land claims by granting most of the Ohio Country to the province of Quebec. The Americans also interpreted the Act as an "establishment" of Catholicism in the colony, as many Americans had participated in the French and Indian War, and they now saw the religious freedoms and land given to their former enemy as an affront.

Background 

Following the defeat of the Kingdom of France by the Kingdom of Great Britain in the Seven Years' War, the peace was formalized with the Treaty of Paris of 1763. Under the terms of the treaty, France ceded New France, specifically the French colony of Canada, to Britain as it was considered less valuable, since its only significant commercial product at the time was beaver pelts, choosing instead to keep the islands of Guadeloupe and Martinique for their valuable sugar production. This territory along the St. Lawrence River, called Canada by the French, was renamed Quebec by the British, after its capital city. Non-military administration of the territories acquired by the British in the war was defined in the Royal Proclamation of 1763. 

Under the terms of the peace treaty, Canadiens who chose not to leave became British subjects. In order for them to serve in public offices, they were required to swear an oath to the King that contained specific provisions rejecting the Catholic faith. Given that many of the predominantly Roman Catholic Canadiens were unwilling to take such an oath, this effectively prevented large numbers of Canadiens from participating in the local governments. 

With unrest, which was growing into the American Revolution, increasing in the colonies to the south, the British were worried that the Canadiens might also support the growing rebellion. At that time, Canadiens formed the vast majority of the settler population of the province of Quebec (more than 99%) and there was little immigration from Great Britain. To secure the allegiance of the approximately 90,000 Canadiens to the British crown, first Governor James Murray and later Governor Guy Carleton promoted the need for change. 

There was also a need to compromise between the conflicting demands of the Canadien subjects and those of newly arrived British subjects. These efforts by the colonial governors eventually resulted in the enactment of the Quebec Act of 1774.

The Act 
Territory: The boundaries of the province were defined by the Act. In addition to the territory defined by the Royal Proclamation, the borders were expanded to include land that is now southern Ontario, Illinois, Indiana, Michigan, Ohio, Wisconsin and parts of Minnesota. This increased the size of the province threefold, restoring the territory of the French province of Canada.
 Religion: The Act allowed public office holders to practice the Roman Catholic faith, by replacing the oath sworn by officials from one sworn to Elizabeth I and her heirs, with one sworn to George III that had no reference to the Protestant faith. This enabled, for the first time, Canadiens to legally participate in the affairs of the provincial government without formally renouncing their faith. It also reestablished the collection of tithes, which had been stopped under the previous administrative rules, and allowed Jesuit priests to return to the province.
 Structure of government: The Act defined the structure of the provincial government. The governor was to be appointed by the Crown, and he was to govern with the assistance of a legislative council; there were no provisions for an elected legislative assembly.
 Law: While the case of Campbell v Hall effectively preserved French law despite the provisions in the Royal Proclamation of 1763, the Act provided for its ouster in favour of English law in matters of public law, criminal law and freedom of testation.
 Land use: The seigneurial system as a means of distributing land and managing its use was restored. This was the system by which the French had administered the province; the British had instituted a township system of land management in 1763.

Legacy

Participation of the Canadiens
The internal communications of the British colonial government at Quebec suggest a relative failure of the purpose of the Quebec Act. On 4 February 1775, Governor Guy Carleton wrote to General Thomas Gage that he believed the Canadiens to be generally happy with the Act, yet he also added:

... I must not however conceal from Your Excellency, that the Gentry, well disposed, and heartily desirous as they are, to serve the Crown, and to serve it with Zeal, when formed into regular Corps, do not relish commanding a bare Militia, they never were used to that Service under the French Government, (and perhaps for good Reasons) besides the sudden Dismission of the Canadian Regiment raised in 1764, without Gratuity or Recompence to Officers, who engaged in our Service almost immediately after the Cession of the Country, of taking any Notice of them since, tho' they all expected half pay, is still uppermost in their Thoughts, and not likely to encourage their engaging a second Time in the same Way; as to the Habitants or Peasantry, ever since the Civil Authority has been introduced into the Province, the Government of it has hung so loose, and retained so little Power, they have in a Manner emancipated themselves, and it will require Time, and discreet Management likewise, to recall them to their ancient Habits of Obedience and Discipline; considering all the new Ideas they have been acquiring for these ten years past, can it be thought they will be pleased at being suddenly, and without Preparation embodied into a Militia, and marched from their Families, Lands, and Habitations to remote Provinces, and all the Horrors of War, which they have already experienced; It would give appearance of Truth to the Language of our Sons of Sedition, at this very Moment busily employed instilling into their Minds, that the Act was passed merely to serve the present Purposes of Government, and in the full Intention of ruling over them with all the Despotism of their ancient Masters.

On June 7, after having received word of the Battles of Lexington and Concord, as well as the capture of Fort Ticonderoga and Benedict Arnold's subsequent raid on Fort Saint-Jean, he wrote to Colonial Secretary Dartmouth:

The little Force we have in the Province was immediately set in Motion, and ordered to assemble at or near St. John's; The Noblesse of this Neighbourhood were called upon to collect their Inhabitants, in order to defend themselves, the Savages of those Parts likewise had the same orders; but tho' the Gentlemen testified great Zeal, neither their Entreaties or their Example could prevail upon the People; a few of the Gentry, consisting principally of the Youth, residing in this Place, and its Neighbourhood, formed a small Corps of Volunteers under the Command of Mr. Samuel Mackay, and took Post at St. John's; the Indians shewed as much Backwardness as the Canadian Peasantry. ...

Less than a month later, on 28 June 1775, Chief Justice William Hey wrote to the Lord Chancellor from Quebec:

... What will be your Lordships astonishment when I tell you that an Act passed for the express purpose of gratifying the Canadians & which was supposed to comprehend all that they either wished or wanted is become the first object of their discontent & dislike. English officers to command them in time of war, & English Laws to govern them in time of Peace, is the general wish. The former they know to be impossible (at least at present) & by the latter if I understand them right, they mean no Laws & no Government whatsoever – in the mean time it may be truly said that Gen. Carleton had taken an ill measure of the influence of the seigneurs & Clergy over the lower order of people whose Principle of conduct founded in fear & the sharpness of authority over them now no longer exercised, is unrestrained, & breaks out in every shape of contempt or detestation of those whom they used to behold with terror & who gave them I believe too many occasions to express it. And they on their parts have been and are too much elated with the advantages they supposed they should derive from the restoration of their old Privileges & customs, & indulged themselves in a way of thinking & talking that gave very just offence, as well to their own People as to the English merchants.

On 21 September 1775, Lieutenant-Governor Cramahé, who governed at Quebec while Carleton was in Montreal, wrote to Dartmouth on the failure to rally the people after word arrived of the impending invasion from the colonies to the south:

Thirteen Colonies 

The Quebec Act angered the Americans and was termed one of the Intolerable Acts by the Patriots, and contributed to the coming of the American Revolution.

Frontiersmen from Virginia and other colonies were already entering that area. Land development companies such as the Ohio Company had already been formed to acquire ownership of large tracts and sell land to settlers and trade with the Indians. Americans denounced the Act for promoting the growth of "Papism" (Catholicism) and cutting back on their freedom and traditional rights. In particular, the colonial governments of New York, Pennsylvania and Virginia were angered by the unilateral assignment of the Ohio lands to Quebec, which had each been granted them in their royal charters. The George Rex protest flag was created in New York as a result.

Langston (2005) looked at press reaction in New England. Some colonial editors explained their views on how it reorganized Canadian governance, explaining how they felt it established direct rule by the Crown and limiting the reach of English law to criminal jurisprudence. Isaiah Thomas of the Massachusetts Spy drew links between the Quebec Act and legislation circumscribing American liberties, such as the Tea Act and the Coercive Acts. Editors shaped public opinion by writing editorials and reprinting opposition letters from both sides of the Atlantic. The First Continental Congress, which met from 5 September to 26 October 1774, addressed the inhabitants of Quebec, warning them of the perils of the supposedly arbitrary and tyrannical nature of Parliament.

The Quebec Act's main significance in the Thirteen Colonies was that it angered the Patriots, and dismayed the Loyalists who supported the Crown, and helped to accelerate the confrontation that became the American Revolution (Miller 1943). The Act is listed as one of the rebels' 27 colonial grievances in the Declaration of Independence as one of the "Acts of pretended Legislation ...

The First Continental Congress petitioned Parliament to repeal the Intolerable Acts, which Parliament declined to do. Instead, in February 1775 Parliament passed the Conciliatory Resolution in an attempt to curry favour with the angry colonists. This was too little, too late, as the war broke out before news of its passage could reach the colonies. Although the Continental Congress did eventually receive this proposal, they ultimately rejected it.

In Quebec, the 1774 Act was effectively superseded by the Constitutional Act 1791, which partitioned Quebec into two new provinces, Upper and Lower Canada. 

The Quebec Act of 1774 is an important predecessor to the First Amendment to the Constitution of the United States by establishing religious freedom.

See also
 Constitutional history of Canada
 Timeline of Quebec history
 History of Ontario
 History of Canada
 American Revolution

References

Citations

Notes

Bibliography

Primary sources
 Cavendish, Sir Henry (1839). Debates of the House of Commons in the Year 1774 on the Bill for Making More Effectual Provision for the Government of the Province of Quebec: Drawn Up from the Notes of the Henry Cavendish, Member for Lostwithiel, London: Ridgway, 303 pp. (online)

External links

Original text of The Quebec Act (bilingual)
Full (clear) text of The Quebec Act – Law Society of Upper Canada

 Digital Reproduction of the Original Act on the Parliamentary Archives catalogue

Great Britain Acts of Parliament 1774
Canada–United States relations
Legal history of Canada
History of Catholicism in Quebec
Political history of Quebec
History of United States expansionism
Laws leading to the American Revolution
1774 in the Thirteen Colonies
1774 in the Province of Quebec (1763–1791)
Constitutions of former British colonies